Petar Pešić was a Serbian general and a Sardar of the Kingdom of Montenegro. During his military career, he was the Minister of War, the Chief of the General Staff of the Army of the Kingdom of Yugoslavia and a senator.

Early career
He was born on September 26, 1871, in Niš, as the son of Todor Pešić, merchant and Persida born Krajnalija. He joined the army in 1889, as a cadet of the 22nd class of the lower school of the Military Academy. He continued his education as a cadet of the 5th grade of the Higher School of the Military Academy. After finishing school, he was on an internship in France from 1900 to 1901 . He also completed the General Staff preparation.

He married in 1907 with Danica, daughter of Generals Vasilije and Sofia Mostić. Her family had a sister, Danica, and a brother, Jovan, who was an officer and a cadet of the 32nd class of the Military Academy.

Active Service

After graduating in 1892, he was promoted to the rank of artillery lieutenant and the first schedule was determined in 1894 to become sergeant in artillery. He was then elected Commander-in-Chief of the Active Army of Milan I on October 15, 1897. After the departure of King Milan from his position, he continued his service as an ordinance officer of King Aleksandar Obrenović from July 29 to December 7, 1900. He was Chief of Staff of the Moravian Divisional Area from 1901 to 1903. On April 10, 1903, he was appointed acting commander of the 2nd Battalion of the 7th Infantry Regiment, and on October 6 of the same year he was transferred to the position of Adjutant Chief of the General Staff. He was appointed Chief of Staff of the Timok Divisional Area on April 10, 1904, and after that only a few months later on June 30, he was appointed commander of the 2nd Battalion of the 20th Infantry Regiment. In addition to his regular duties, he was an assistant professor of Tactics from October 29, 1904, at the Military Academy. From 1904 until 1912, he was a member of the Central Committee for Border Actions. He continued his service as the Chief of Staff of the Danube Divisional Area and the commander of the artillery battalion. He spent six years in that position from 1904 to 1910. During that period, in addition to his regular duties, he was appointed on May 14, 1906, for the ordinance of Prince George and January 29, 1907. and for a full professor of Tactics at the Military Academy to Prince in 1910. After these duties, he became commander of the infantry regiment. He was the Adjutant General of the Army from March 3, 1911, until 1912.

The Balkan Wars and World War I
During the Balkan Wars, he was appointed Assistant Chief of Staff of the 1st Army. In September 1912, he was sent to Lucerne to make an agreement on military cooperation with Montenegro for the war against Turkey around May 1913. On September 10, he was sent to Greece to conclude a military convention for the war against Bulgaria, and on September 10, he was sent to Athens as a military envoy and remained in that position until July 28, 1914.

During World War I, he was sent to Montenegro, and on July 29, 1914, he was appointed Assistant Chief of Staff of the Montenegrin Supreme Command. Following the resignation of General Božidar Janković on April 20, 1915, the Supreme Command appointed Colonel Pešić Chief of Staff of the Montenegrin Supreme Command and delegate of the Serbian Supreme Command in Montenegro. He remained in that position until January 20, 1916, after which he was appointed Assistant Chief of Staff of the Serbian Supreme Command. During that period, from January to February, he was sent as a delegate to Chantillyto the Conference of Delegates of the Allied High Command to arrange for the Royal Serbian Army to be rearmed and equipped.

Service in Yugoslavia and Political Career
After the end of the war, from January to September, he was appointed head of the military mission to the Yugoslav delegation at the 1919 Paris Peace Conference. On September 20, 1919, he was appointed Deputy Chief of Staff of the Supreme Command, and from May 6, 1920, appointed Assistant and Deputy Chief of Staff. On March 10, 1921, he was appointed Commander of the Sava Divisional Area, then on July 20, transferred to Assistant Commander of the IV Army District, and on December 8 of the same year, became Chief of the General Staff. In Pasic's governments since November 4, 1922 until July 30, 1924, was appointed Minister of the Army and Navy. After that, he was re-appointed Chief of the General Staff and Honorary Adjutant of the King. He remained in that position until April 11, 1929 when he retired.

He became an ambassador to Belgium on April 20, 1929, and on April 4, 1930, an ambassador to Czechoslovakia. It was again on March 15, 1931, he was returned as an ambassador to Belgium and remained in that position until February 28, 1935. After these functions, he lost his job for four years. He became a royal senator in 1939. He returned from retirement on November 7, 1940,  and again appointed in the government of Dragiša Cvetković as Minister of the Army and Navy. In this government, he made the decision to join the Axis Powers because the Royal Yugoslav Army was not ready to confront the Germans. With the Yugoslav coup d'état of March 27, 1941, he was removed from his position and retired again. After the Invasion of Yugoslavia, he remained politically passive and spent the occupation in Belgrade.

Death
He and his wife died on September 6, 1944, during the Allied bombing of Yugoslavia in World War II. He was buried in the Belgrade New Cemetery.

Awards
Order of Karađorđe's Star, with swords, III and IV Degrees
Order of the White Eagle, IV Degree
Order of St. Sava, III Degree
Order of the Cross of Takovo, IV Degree

Foreign Awards
: Legion of Honour
: Order of Saint Stanislaus

Works  
 Rešavanje taktičkih zadataka, Belgrade, 1900
 Elementi taktike i takičke radnje, 1904
 Taktika konjice, 1906
 Duh savremenog ratovanja, 1910
 Srpska taktika, 1912
 Taktika I i II, Belgrade 1921
 Solunski front i vojnopolitička akcija, Belgrade 1921
 Proboj Solunskog fronta, 1922
 Naš rat sa Turcima 1876—1877. godine, 1925

References

Bibliography
 
 
 

1871 births
1944 deaths
Military personnel from Niš
People from the Principality of Serbia
People from the Kingdom of Serbia
Serbian military personnel of the Balkan Wars
Serbian military personnel of World War I
Chetniks of the Macedonian Struggle
Serbian generals
Montenegrin generals
Army general (Kingdom of Yugoslavia)
Recipients of the Order of St. Sava
Burials at Belgrade New Cemetery
Serbian civilians killed in World War II
Deaths by airstrike during World War II